Arthur Robertson may refer to:

Arthur Robertson (athlete) (1879–1957), Scottish distance runner
Arthur G. Robertson (1879–?), British water polo player
Arthur Robertson (footballer) (1916–1991), Australian rules footballer for St Kilda
Arthur Scott Robertson (1911–2000), fiddle player from Shetland